The Nikon D2H is a professional-grade digital single-lens reflex camera introduced by Nikon Corporation on July 22, 2003. It uses Nikon's own JFET-LBCAST sensor with a 4.1-megapixel resolution, and is optimised for sports and action shooting that require a high frame rate. In 2005, the D2H was replaced by the D2Hs, which added new features derived from the 12-megapixel D2X digital SLR. The D2Hs was discontinued after the introduction of the D300 and D3 models.

Like most early Nikon Digital SLR cameras, it uses a "DX Format" sensor, which applies a crop factor compared to 35 mm film of approximately 1.5×.

D2Hs 

The D2Hs was announced on February 16, 2005, adding several improvements to the D2H design, although with the same sensor and body. Nikon added an improved light metering system, faster subject acquisition and tracking algorithms to the Multi-CAM-2000 Autofocus module, and expanded both the JPEG and RAW continuous shooting buffer.

Nikon also reported improved noise reduction at high sensor sensitivities. The ASIC image processing was changed to 12-bit from the original D2H 8-bit. Auto White Balance was altered with improved low color temperature lighting, mixed ambient, and speedlight lighting. SYCC color space was added, and Exif compliance was adjusted from Exif 2.2 to Exif 2.21, DCF 2.0, and DPOF.

GPS support and improved wireless support (with WT-2 transmitter for 802.11b/g) were also added. A new LCD screen of the same size but with increased resolution and a higher refresh rate was added to the body. The screen's playback mode now supports 15x zoom instead of the 8x of the D2H, with RGB Histogram.

The menus have been expanded to include an additional 5 languages for a total of 10. Like the D2X, it features a recent settings list, world time function, and modified vertical shooting buttons and CompactFlash card door opening.

The D2Hs features a continuous burst rate of up to 8 frames per second, with a buffer capacity of 50 JPEG files or 40 NEF (Nikon Electric Format- Nikon's proprietary Camera RAW image format) files. The 4.1 megapixel sensor has an ISO sensitivity equivalency of ISO 200–1600, in 1/3, 1/2, and 1 stop increments, as well as Hi-1 and Hi-2 ISO boosts (3200 and 6400 equivalency).

It offers full compatibility with AF-S, VR, DX, D and G type AF-Nikkor lenses, all functions except autofocus and some exposure modes with D-type Manual Focus Nikkors, with AI-P Nikkors all functions except 3D Color Matrix Metering II, 3D Multi-Sensor Balanced Fill-Flash and AF possible.

The D2Hs, like the D2X, offers compatibility with Non-CPU AI Nikkor lenses, which are usable in aperture-priority or manual exposure mode with Matrix-Metering, Center-Weighted and Spot metering available.

Reaction to improvements over the D2H

Although the D2Hs has been considered by some to be obsolete from its very introduction due to its relatively low 4.1 megapixel resolution, the D2Hs has a reputation for extremely high image quality and excellent detail rendition.

The D2Hs offers a noticeable improvement over the D2H in overall image quality and many users have reported that color rendition is improved in JPEG files (raw is the same), while the camera manages to offer a great improvement in noise at high sensitivities versus the D2H

Infrared contamination
The D2H series has a relatively weak infrared (IR) filter, allowing infrared photography with the use of an IR bandpass filter, but contaminating regular images by causing certain dark-colored fabrics to take on a slight magenta color cast. Skin tones may also appear slightly ruddy. Use of a No. 486 digital UV/IR blocking filter can help resolve the problem with lenses that are at least 50 mm or longer. Lenses shorter than 50 mm are not recommended for use with a No. 486 filter due to a tendency for the corners of the image to take on a cyan color cast.

References

External links 

 Nikon D2H Product Page – Nikon Global Website
 Nikon D2Hs Product Page – Nikon Global Website
 Nikon Nikon D2H Digital Camera Reviewed | Bjorn Rorslett
 Nikon D2h Review, dpreview.com

D2H
D2H